Alvar-e Olya (also Romanized as Alvār-e ‘Olyā; also known as Alvār, Alvār-e Bālā, Alvār Yūkhārī, Malyy Al’var, and Yūkhārī Alvār) is a village in Aji Chay Rural District, in the Central District of Tabriz County, East Azerbaijan Province, Iran. At the 2006 census, its population was 1,309, in 357 families.

References 

Populated places in Tabriz County